Su Bingqi (1909 – 30 June 1997) was a Chinese archaeologist and co-founder of Peking University's archaeology program. He was China's major archaeological theoretician for 50 years, and regarded in his later years as the paramount authority in the archaeology of China. He was best known for his "regional systems and cultural types" model of Chinese Neolithic cultural development, which rejected the traditional view of Chinese culture radiating from the core Central Plain region and has been widely adopted. It was further developed by Kwang-chih Chang as the Chinese Interaction Sphere model.

Biography 
Su was born in 1909 in Gaoyang County, Hebei Province. From 1928 to 1934 he studied history at Beijing Normal University. After graduation he joined the Institute of Historical Studies of the Peiping Academy (a predecessor of the Chinese Academy of Sciences) and its excavation team at the Doujitai archaeological site in Baoji, Shaanxi Province, where he spent three years, from 1934 to 1937, under the guidance of senior archaeologist Xu Xusheng, who had a significant influence on him. Su completed the excavation report in 1945, but it was published only in 1948.

In 1940 Su wrote a book analyzing the types of li pottery tripods excavated at Doujitai, but lost the manuscript in the chaos of the Second Sino-Japanese War. Some of the contents were published in his excavation report, but it took 40 years before an abridged version of the study was finally published. The book was highly regarded as "probably the most ambitious and systematic project of pottery typology" in Chinese archaeology. Su used li vessel typology to determine ethnic affiliations of archaeological sites, and his methodology has been adopted by generations of Chinese scholars.

After the founding of the People's Republic of China in 1949, Su became a fellow of the Institute of Archaeology, Chinese Academy of Social Sciences (under the Chinese Academy of Sciences until 1977). In 1952 he co-founded China's first university archaeology program at Peking University, then under the Department of History, where he trained many of China's leading archaeologists who have been greatly influenced by him. After the death of Xia Nai, Su was elected to succeed him as President of the Chinese Archaeology Association in 1986.

Su Bingqi died on 30 June 1997. In 2005, his biography, written by his son Su Kaizhi, was published by Joint Publishing.

Multi-region model 
After the disruption to academic research caused by the Cultural Revolution, in 1979 Su proposed the influential "regional systems and cultural types" model of Chinese Neolithic cultural development (published in 1981 in the journal Wenwu). Rejecting the traditional point of view that the Central Plain (Yellow River valley) was the cradle of Chinese civilization and radiated out to backward regions in the rest of China, Su argued that archaeological data had proven that ancient cultures were developing simultaneously in multiple regions and influenced each other, including the Central Plain.

Many scholars, especially Su's students, consider the multi-region model his most important theoretical contribution. In the view of Li Feng of Columbia University, although the theory "does little more than synthesize what had already been revealed by the extensive archaeological work" of the recent past, it was a powerful tool for analyzing prehistoric development in Neolithic China. According to archaeologist Kwang-chih Chang of Harvard University, Su's theory legitimized a view of ancient China that had been regarded as heresy. Based on Su's model, Chang developed the model of "Chinese Interaction Sphere" in 1986. Their theories have since been widely accepted in academia.

References

Bibliography

1909 births
1997 deaths
Chinese archaeologists
Beijing Normal University alumni
Academic staff of Peking University
People from Baoding
Scientists from Hebei
Educators from Hebei
20th-century archaeologists